Momentum Adventure is a company that specialises in adventure holidays. It was founded by Mathew Robertson in 2005.

History
Momentum Adventure was founded in 2005 by Matthew Robertson who said that he wanted to add an "element of velvet lining" to adventure travel.

Operations

Momentum guides hold the highest IFMGA accreditation.  They include Johan Aregard, a former Swedish Special Forces soldier,  Dave Pearce, a former Royal Marine & survival consultant for Bear Grylls, and John Falkiner, a film stunt coordinator.

Packages

The custom designed trips start at around $7,000 a person, span all seven continents and range in length from two to 21 days. They are tailored to the specific fitness levels and interests of their individual clients.

Areas of specialty for the company include the Arctic Circle, Borneo, Baja, Jordan, Yukon, Lebanon, British Columbia and Japan. Each trip has fewer than six people, and due to the specialised nature of the packages, the company only runs a dozen of them per year.

Momentum also offers corporate team building events.

See also 
 Adventure Travel
Backpacking (travel) 
Backpacking (hiking)
Experimental travel
Long distance motorcycle riding
Outdoor education
Parachuting
Travel documentary
Travel writing

References

Companies based in East Sussex
Transport companies established in 2005
Travel and holiday companies of the United Kingdom
Adventure travel